Mørke is a town located in East Jutland, on the southwestern part of the Djursland peninsula, Denmark. It is a commuter town of the city of Aarhus, which lies approximately 26 kilometers to the southwest, and a railway town at Grenaabanen, the railroad between the cities of Aarhus and Grenaa. Mørke is located in Syddjurs Municipality, which in turn is part of Region Midtjylland, and has a population of 1,698 (1 January 2022).

Mørke is served by Mørke railway station, located on the Grenaa railway line between Aarhus and Grenaa.

The 2005 Danish film Murk by Jannik Johansen is named for the town.

References

Cities and towns in the Central Denmark Region
Syddjurs Municipality